Red-eyed frog may refer to:

 Red-eyed stream frog (Duellmanohyla uranochroa), a frog in the family Hylidae found in Costa Rica and Panama
 Red-eyed tree frog (disambiguation)
 Agalychnis callidryas, native to Central America and Colombia
 Agalychnis taylori, native to Mexico and Central America
 Ranoidea chloris, native to Australia

Animal common name disambiguation pages